Leo David Mazzone (born October 16, 1948) is a former pitcher in minor league baseball and pitching coach in Major League Baseball. He is currently the Special Pitching Advisor for the Furman University Baseball program.

Early life
Although Mazzone was born in West Virginia, his family lived on the other side of the Potomac River's north branch in Luke, Maryland. Growing up there, one of his friends was Sam Perlozzo of nearby Cumberland, Maryland, under whom Mazzone would eventually coach for the Baltimore Orioles. Mazzone was even the best man at Perlozzo's wedding.

Playing career
In , he was a player-manager for the class-A Corpus Christi Seagulls. He became their full-time manager the following season.

Coaching career
It was the recommendation and contacts of Eagles owner Ray Kuhlman that proved instrumental in Atlanta deciding to take a chance on Mazzone in 1979.

Mazzone has earned a reputation as one of the best pitching coaches of the modern era,  having molded Tom Glavine and John Smoltz into perennial All-Stars.  Greg Maddux also enjoyed his best seasons under Mazzone. During his time in Atlanta, Mazzone developed and coached some of the best pitching rotations in baseball history. In 2005, ESPN ranked the 1998 (#1) and the 1993 (#4) Atlanta Braves pitching staffs as two of the Top 10 rotations of all time. This dominant pitching anchored the Braves' run of 14 consecutive division titles (1991-2005), 5 National League pennants (1991-1992, 1995-1996, 1999) and the 1995 World Series championship.

Between 1991 and 1998, three of his pitchers won a total of 6 Cy Young Awards: 
Tom Glavine - 1991 and 1998
 Greg Maddux - 1993, 1994, and 1995 (also won the award in 1992 with the Chicago Cubs)
 John Smoltz - 1996

Maddux, Glavine, and Smoltz have all been inducted into the National Baseball Hall of Fame. Over the years, a number of other pitchers joined the Braves and enjoyed some of their finest seasons under Mazzone only to regress after leaving.

Mazzone's "accidental trademark" is his rocking back and forth while sitting in the dugout.  On television broadcasts of Braves games, the camera would often show him rocking back and forth during the game.  Mazzone's pitching philosophies state that pitchers should throw more between starts (two sessions instead of one) and be able to throw strikes on the low and outside corner of the strike zone.

After the 2005 season Leo Mazzone took the Baltimore Orioles pitching coach job.  On October 12, 2007 the Orioles fired Mazzone with one year left on his contract.

On August 30, 2016, Leo Mazzone was hired by Head Coach Brett Harker of the Furman University Baseball program as a Special Pitching advisor.

Honors
He was inducted in the Kinston Professional Baseball Hall of Fame in 1993.

In his book The Baseball Economist, J.C. Bradbury titles a chapter, "How Good is Leo Mazzone?" Using statistical analysis, he analyzes whether Mazzone had a significant impact upon the pitchers that he coached. The sample is all pitchers who have pitched at least one year under Mazzone and one year under a different pitching coach. Bradbury found that Mazzone lowered the ERA of pitchers by an average of 0.64 points, and that after leaving Mazzone, pitchers' ERA increased by an average of 0.78 points. Bradbury believes that such an impact is deserving of Hall of Fame consideration.

ESPN.com lists him number one on the list of "Top 10 Assistant Coaches of All-Time".

On July 30, 2022, the Atlanta Braves inducted him into the franchise Hall of Fame.

Post-coaching career
Currently, Mazzone works as a color commentator for Fox. On August 30, 2016, Mazzone was named Special Advisor to the Furman University (Greenville, SC) Baseball Program. He resides in upstate South Carolina.

References

External links

1948 births
Living people
Amarillo Giants players
Baseball coaches from Maryland
Baseball managers
Baseball players from Maryland
Atlanta Braves announcers
Atlanta Braves coaches
Baltimore Orioles coaches
Baseball players from West Virginia
Birmingham A's players
Corpus Christi Seagulls players
Decatur Commodores players
Georges Creek Valley
Major League Baseball broadcasters
Major League Baseball pitchers
Major League Baseball pitching coaches
Medford Giants players
Minor league baseball managers
People from Keyser, West Virginia
Sportspeople from Cumberland, Maryland
Tucson Toros players